Thomas or Tom Hagen may refer to:

 Thomas Hagen (bobsledder) (born 1950), Swiss bobsledder
 Thomas Hagen (politician) (1919–1985), New Caledonian politician
 Thomas B. Hagen (born 1935/36), American billionaire businessman
 Tom Hagen, a fictional character in The Godfather
 Tom Hagen (businessman) (born 1950), Norwegian businessman
 Tom Harald Hagen (born 1978), Norwegian football referee

See also 
 Tom Hagan (born 1947), American basketball player